Journey to Jah is the 2002 second LP released by the Reggae artist Gentleman, produced by Dean Frazer.

Track listing 
 "Dem Gone" - 4:03
 "Ina Different Time (feat. Jahmali & Daddy Rings)" - 3:51
 "Runaway" - 3:41
 "Man A Rise (feat. Bounty Killer)" - 3:32
 "Love Chant" - 4:34
 "See Dem Coming" - 3:52
 "Man Of My Own (feat. Morgan Heritage)" - 3:52
 "Leave Us Alone" - 3:27
 "Long Face" - 3:55
 "Younger Generation (feat. Luciano & Mikey General)" - 4:47
 "Dangerzone (feat. Junior Kelly)" - 4:10
 "Empress" - 4:10
 "Fire Ago Bun Dem (feat. Capleton)" - 3:58
 "Jah Ina Yuh Life" - 3:47
 "Children Of Tomorrow (feat. Jack Radics)" - 4:44

Journey to Jah
Journay to Jah